Michael Krabler (born 22 October 1996) is a German footballer who plays as a centre-forward for TSV Rain am Lech.

Career
Krabler made his professional debut for SpVgg Unterhaching in the 3. Liga on 23 May 2015, coming on as a substitute in the 73rd minute for Tobias Killer in the 0–1 away loss against Rot-Weiß Erfurt.

References

External links
 Profile at DFB.de
 Profile at kicker.de
 SpVgg Unterhaching II statistics 2013–14 at BFV.de
 TSV Rain am Lech II statistics 2018–19 at BFV.de

1996 births
Living people
People from Neuburg an der Donau
Sportspeople from Upper Bavaria
Footballers from Bavaria
German footballers
Association football forwards
SpVgg Unterhaching players
3. Liga players
Regionalliga players
SpVgg Unterhaching II players
FC Unterföhring players
TSV Rain am Lech players